Jand may refer to:

Places 
Jand, Attock, a town in Jand Tehsil, Attock District, Punjab, Pakistan
Jand, Chakwal, a village and union council in Chakwal District, Punjab, Pakistan
Jand, Jalandhar, a village in Punjab, India
Jánd, a village in eastern Hungary
Jand (Transoxania), a medieval town in Central Asia

Other uses 
Prosopis cineraria (Punjabi: jand), a species of flowering tree